Vincent G. Kehres (born February 1976) is an American football coach and former player. He is the defensive coordinator at University of Toledo, a position he has held since 2020. Kehres served as the head football coach at the University of Mount Union in Alliance, Ohio from 2013 to 2019. In seven seasons at the helm of the Mount Union Purple Raiders football program, he compiled a record of 95–6 and led Mount Union to two NCAA Division III Football Championship titles, in 2015 and 2017. Kehres is the son of College Football Hall of Fame inductee Larry Kehres, who preceded him as head football coach at Mount Union.

Coaching career
Kehres both played as a player and served as an assistant coach and defensive coordinator under his father. Prior to his return to Mount Union to coach in 2000, he briefly coached as an assistant for a single year at Austintown Fitch High School.

Kehres was named the head football coach at Mount Union on May 8, 2013.

On January 13, 2020, The Blade reported that Kehres was leaving Mount Union to take a position with the Toledo Rockets as a defensive coach.

Family
Kehres is the son of Larry Kehres, who preceded him as head football coach at Mount Union. The younger Kehres and his wife, Lindsay, have three sons, Evan, Bo, and Jackson.

Head coaching record

References

External links
 Toledo profile
 Mount Union profile

1976 births
Living people
American football defensive ends
Mount Union Purple Raiders football coaches
Mount Union Purple Raiders football players
Toledo Rockets football coaches
High school football coaches in Ohio
Coaches of American football from Ohio
Players of American football from Ohio